The Sula lorikeet  (Saudareos flavoviridis) is a species of parrot in the family Psittaculidae. It is endemic to the Sula Islands in Indonesia. It is found in forest and woodland at altitudes up to 2400 m. It is generally common.

Taxonomy
This species was formerly placed in the genus Trichoglossus but was moved to a newly introduced genus Saudareos based on the results of a molecular genetic analysis of the lorikeets published in 2020. It was formerly considered conspecific with the yellow-cheeked lorikeet and collectively called the citrine lorikeet.

Description
The Sula lorikeet is a mainly green parrot about 20 cm (8.0 in) long. Its bill is orange. In the nominate subspecies the head and chest are yellow, the latter narrowly scaled with green, and the lores and region near the bill are dark, often appearing almost blackish.

References

External links
Photos of the Yellow-and-green Lorikeet (both subspecies). The Internet Bird Collection.
Oriental Bird Images: Citrine Lorikeet  Selected photos

Saudareos
Birds described in 1863
Taxonomy articles created by Polbot
Taxobox binomials not recognized by IUCN